The Flag of Pallava was used by the Tamil Pallava Kingdom. The Pallava royal insignia was the Simha (Lion) and Nandi (Bull) which was changeable. But Color of flags saffron or yellow. Each Pallava king had his own personal banner. Example, Narasimhavarman II used the lion as his emblem and Nandivarman II preferred the Nandi. Under the reign of Paramesvaravarman I was Khatvanga (Skull mace) added to Pallava emblem. There were probably different Pallava lines, The main line ruled in Kanchipuram and comes from the Simha line (Simhavarman I, Simhavishnu, Narasimhavarman I...). The Simha emblem were inherited from descendants of the Simha line.

See also 
 Flag of Pandya
 Flag of Chola
 Flags of Tamils

References 

Pallava dynasty
Pallava
Pallava